Byron Keith (born Cletus Leo Schwitters; November 17, 1917 – January 19, 1996) was an American actor. He also worked on radio as Clete Lee.

Keith made his film debut in the 1946 Orson Welles thriller The Stranger and appeared mostly in supporting character roles in film and television productions, including Untamed Mistress (1956), The Great Bank Robbery (1969) and Beware! The Blob (1972). He is best known for his recurring part as Gotham City's Mayor Linseed on the 1960s television series Batman. He also had a recurring role as police lieutenant Roy Gilmore in 77 Sunset Strip.

Filmography

References

External links

1917 births
1996 deaths
American male television actors
20th-century American male actors
People from El Paso, Illinois
Male actors from Illinois